Interview with the Vampire is a 1994 American gothic horror film directed by Neil Jordan, based on Anne Rice's 1976 novel of the same name, and starring Tom Cruise and Brad Pitt. It focuses on Lestat (Cruise) and Louis (Pitt), beginning with Louis's transformation into a vampire by Lestat in 1791. The film chronicles their time together, and their turning of ten-year-old Claudia (Kirsten Dunst) into a vampire. The narrative is framed by a present-day interview, in which Louis tells his story to a San Francisco reporter. The supporting cast features Christian Slater, Antonio Banderas, and Stephen Rea.

The film was released in November 1994 to generally positive reviews and was a commercial success. It received Oscar nominations for Best Art Direction and Best Original Score. Kirsten Dunst was additionally nominated for a Golden Globe for Best Supporting Actress for her role in the film. A stand-alone sequel, Queen of the Damned, was released in 2002, with Stuart Townsend replacing Cruise as Lestat.

Plot
In modern-day San Francisco, reporter Daniel Molloy interviews Louis de Pointe du Lac, who claims to be a vampire. Louis describes his human life as a wealthy plantation owner in 1791 Spanish Louisiana. Despondent following the death of his wife and unborn child, he drunkenly wanders the waterfront of New Orleans one night and is attacked by the vampire Lestat de Lioncourt. Lestat senses Louis's dissatisfaction with life and offers to turn him into a vampire. Louis accepts, but quickly comes to regret it. While Lestat revels in the hunt and killing of humans, Louis resists his instinct to kill, instead drinking animal blood to sustain himself.

Eventually, amid an outbreak of plague in New Orleans, Louis feeds on a little girl whose mother died in the plague. To entice Louis to stay with him, Lestat turns the dying girl, Claudia, into a vampire. Together, they raise her as a daughter. Louis has a love for Claudia, while Lestat spoils and treats her more as a pupil, training her to become a merciless killer. Thirty years pass, and Claudia matures psychologically but remains a little girl in appearance and continues to be treated as such by Lestat. When she realizes that she will never grow older or become a mature woman, she is furious with Lestat and tells Louis that they should leave him. She tricks Lestat into drinking the "dead blood" of twin boys whom she killed by overdose with laudanum, which weakens Lestat, and then slits his throat. Though Louis is shocked and upset, he helps Claudia dump Lestat's body in a  swamp. They spend weeks planning a voyage to Europe to search for other vampires, but Lestat returns on the night of their departure, having survived on the blood of swamp creatures. Lestat attacks them, but Louis sets him on fire, allowing them to escape to their ship and depart.

After traveling around Europe and the Mediterranean but finding no other vampires, Louis and Claudia settle in Paris in September 1870. Louis encounters vampires Santiago and Armand by chance. Armand invites Louis and Claudia to his coven, the Théâtre des Vampires, where vampires stage theatrical horror shows for humans. On their way out of the theater, Santiago reads Louis's mind and suspects that Louis and Claudia murdered Lestat. Armand warns Louis to send Claudia away for her own safety, and Louis stays with Armand to learn about the meaning of being a vampire. Claudia demands that Louis turn a human woman, Madeleine, into a vampire to be her new protector and companion, and he reluctantly complies. Shortly thereafter, the Parisian vampires abduct the three of them and punish them for Lestat's murder, imprisoning Louis in a coffin and trapping Claudia and Madeleine in a chamber, where sunlight burns them to ash. Armand does nothing to prevent this, but the next day he frees Louis. Seeking revenge, Louis returns to the theater at dawn and sets it on fire, killing all the vampires including Santiago. Armand arrives in time to help Louis escape the sunrise, and again offers him a place by his side. Louis rejects Armand and leaves, unable to accept Armand's way of life which involve forgetting the past and knowing Armand had allowed Claudia's murder.

As decades pass, Louis never recovers from the loss of Claudia and dejectedly explores the world alone. He returns to New Orleans in 1988 and one night encounters a decayed, weakened Lestat, living as a recluse in an abandoned mansion and surviving on rat blood as Louis once had. Lestat expresses regret for having turned Claudia into a vampire and asks Louis to rejoin him, but Louis declines and leaves. Louis concludes his interview with Molloy, prompting Molloy to beseech Louis to make him his new vampire companion. Louis is outraged that Molloy has not understood the tale of suffering he has related, and attacks Molloy to scare him into abandoning the idea. Molloy runs to his car and takes off, while playing the cassette tapes of Louis' interview in his car. On the Golden Gate Bridge, Lestat appears and attacks Molloy, taking control of the car. Revived by Molloy's blood, Lestat offers Molloy the choice that he "never had"—whether or not to become a vampire—and, laughing, continues driving.

Cast

 Tom Cruise as Lestat de Lioncourt
 Brad Pitt as Louis de Pointe du Lac
 Stephen Rea as Santiago
 Antonio Banderas as Armand
 Christian Slater as Daniel Molloy
 Kirsten Dunst as Claudia
 Domiziana Giordano as Madeleine
 Thandiwe Newton (credited as Thandie Newton) as Yvette
 Indra Ové as New Orleans Whore
 Laure Marsac as Mortal Woman on Stage
 George Kelly as Dollmaker
 Marcel Iureş as Paris Vampire
 Sara Stockbridge as Estelle

Production

Development
The rights to Rice's novel were initially purchased by Paramount Pictures in April 1976, shortly before the book was published. However, the script lingered in development hell for years, with the rights being sold to Lorimar before finally ending up with Warner Bros. Director Neil Jordan was approached by Warner Bros. to direct after the huge success of his movie The Crying Game (1992). Jordan was intrigued by the script, calling it "really interesting and slightly theatrical", but was especially interested after reading Rice's novel. He agreed to direct on the condition that he be allowed to write his own script, though he did not gain a writing credit. The themes of Catholic guilt which pervade the novel attracted Jordan, who called the story "the most wonderful parable about wallowing in guilt that I'd ever come across. But these things are unconscious, I don't have an agenda."

With David Geffen producing, the movie was given a $70 million budget, unprecedented for a film in the vampire genre. Jordan stated that:

Casting
Author Anne Rice adapted her 1976 novel Interview with the Vampire into a screenplay with French actor Alain Delon in mind for the role of Louis. Later on, when Interview entered the casting stage, British actor Julian Sands was championed by Anne Rice and fans of the novel to play Lestat, but because Sands was not a well-known name at the time (being only famed for his performance in A Room with a View), he was rejected and the role was given to Tom Cruise. Because of his star power, Cruise received a record $10 million salary and a percentage of the profits. The casting was initially criticized by Anne Rice, who said that Cruise was "no more my vampire Lestat than Edward G. Robinson is Rhett Butler", and the casting was "so bizarre; it's almost impossible to imagine how it's going to work". She recommended a number of other actors including John Malkovich, Peter Weller, Jeremy Irons, and Alexander Godunov. She suggested that Brad Pitt and Tom Cruise switch roles, stating that "I tried for a long time to tell them that they should just reverse these roles—have Brad Pitt play Lestat and have Tom Cruise play Louis. Of course, they don't listen to me."

Eventually, Rice became satisfied with Cruise's performance after seeing the completed film, saying that "from the moment he appeared, Tom was Lestat for me" and "that Tom did make Lestat work was something I could not see in a crystal ball." She called Cruise to compliment him and admit that she was wrong.

Due to Rice's perception of Hollywood's homophobia, at one point she rewrote the part of Louis, changing his sex to female, in order to specifically heterosexualize the character's relationship with Lestat. At the time, Rice felt it was the only way to get the film made, and singer-actress Cher was considered for the part. A song titled "Lovers Forever", which Cher wrote along with Shirley Eikhard for the film's soundtrack, got rejected as Pitt was ultimately cast for the role, though a dance-pop version of the song was released on Cher's 2013 album, Closer to the Truth.

Originally, River Phoenix was cast for the role of Daniel Molloy (as Anne Rice liked the idea), but he died four weeks before he was due to begin filming. When Christian Slater was cast in his place as Molloy, he donated his entire salary to Phoenix's favorite charitable organizations. The film has a dedication to Phoenix after the end credits. Ten-year-old actress Kirsten Dunst was spotted by talent scouts and was the first girl tested for the role of Claudia. Julia Stiles also auditioned for Claudia but Neill Jordan considered her "too old".

Filming
Filming took place primarily in New Orleans and in London, with limited location shooting done in San Francisco and Paris. Louis's plantation was a combination of primarily Destrehan Plantation, just west of New Orleans, and Oak Alley Plantation in nearby Vacherie. The depiction of 18th- and early-19th-century New Orleans was achieved with a combination of location shooting in the French Quarter of New Orleans and filming on a purpose-built waterfront set along the Mississippi river. Production then moved to London, where interior sets were constructed at Pinewood Studios. The sets designed by Dante Ferretti included the interiors of Louis, Lestat and Claudia's New Orleans townhouse, Claudia and Louis's Paris hotel suite, the Théâtre des Vampires (built on Pinewood's 007 Stage), and the catacombs where the Parisien vampires live. Shooting took place in San Francisco, mainly on the Golden Gate Bridge, with the external façade of Louis's hotel located at the intersection of Taylor Street, Market Street, and Golden Gate Avenue. In Paris the exterior and lobby of the Opera Garnier were dressed to film Louis and Claudia's arrival at their hotel in Paris.

Brad Pitt admitted in a 2011 interview with Entertainment Weekly that he was "miserable" while making the film and even tried to buy himself out of his contract at one point. Pitt called the production "six-months of f---king darkness" because of the almost-exclusive night shoots, filmed mostly in London in the depths of winter, which sent him into a depression. The script, which he received only two weeks prior to filming, was also a source of disappointment. He unfavorably contrasted the character of Louis which he had admired in the book to that presented in the script:

Special effects
Visual effects were overseen by Stan Winston and his team, while the newly founded Digital Domain was responsible for creating the digital effects under Visual Effects Supervisor Robert Legato. Director Neil Jordan was initially hesitant to use Stan Winston Studios, because they had gained a reputation for specializing in large-scale animatronics and CGI with Jurassic Park and Terminator 2: Judgment Day; Interview with the Vampire was going to require mostly makeup effects. Winston designed the characters' vampire appearances and makeup effects, including a technique for stenciling translucent blue veins on the actors' faces. This required the actors to hang upside down for 30 minutes, so that the blood would rush to their heads and cause their veins to protrude, enabling the makeup artists to trace realistic patterns.

Digital effects were used mainly to add small details or to enhance certain physical effects, like the burning of the New Orleans set or the burning of Louis's plantation, whereby CGI flames were imposed on a miniature of the house. The most difficult digital effects to illustrate were Louis and Claudia's transformations into vampires, which were technologically very advanced for the time. The scene where Claudia cuts Lestat's throat was achieved by transferring from Tom Cruise bleeding from a prosthetic wound to an animatronic model designed to 'wither' as it bled out, enhanced with CGI blood. Winston also sculpted the rough model for the charred remains of Claudia and Madeleine, using archival photographs of victims from Hiroshima for inspiration.

Pre-screening
A rough-cut of Interview was shown to test audiences, who according to producer David Geffen felt "there was a little too much blood and violence." The screenings were held over the objection of Neil Jordan, who was planning on further paring down the length of the film before previewing it, but Geffen wanted to show the longer version in order to "get a feel for what the audience wanted." Eventually about 20 minutes' worth of footage was either cut or re-arranged before the theatrical version was ready.

Release

Box office
Interview with the Vampire was a box-office success. The film opened on November 11, 1994 (Veterans Day) and opening weekend grosses amounted to $36.4 million, surpassing Home Alone 2: Lost in New York to achieve a November record, placing it in the number one position at the US box office above The Santa Clause which opened with $19.3 million. However, some in the industry disputed the figure and the range of estimates by others were from $34 to $37 million. At that time, Interview with the Vampire had the fifth-highest three-day opening weekend of all time, behind Jurassic Park, Batman Returns, The Lion King and Batman. Its opening was at that time the biggest non-summer opening and the biggest R-rated opening weekend ever. The film would hold the latter record until 1997 when it was surpassed by Air Force One. Moreover, Interview with the Vampire held the record for having the highest opening weekend for a Brad Pitt film until it was taken by Ocean's Eleven in 2001. In subsequent weeks, it struggled against Star Trek Generations and The Santa Clause. Total gross in the United States was $105 million, while the worldwide gross was $224 million, with an estimated budget of $60 million.

Critical reception

On Rotten Tomatoes the film holds an approval rating of 64% based on 58 reviews, with a rating average of 5.9/10. The site's consensus reads: "Despite lacking some of the book's subtler shadings, and suffering from some clumsy casting, Interview with the Vampire benefits from Neil Jordan's atmospheric direction and a surfeit of gothic thrills." On Metacritic the film holds a score of 59 out of 100 based on reviews from 19 critics, indicating "mixed or average reviews". Audiences polled by CinemaScore gave the film an average grade of "B+" on an A+ to F scale.

Praise from The New York Times Janet Maslin and the Chicago Sun-Times Roger Ebert was tempered by negative reviews by The Washington Post's Rita Kempley and Desson Howe and Time magazine's Richard Corliss.

Oprah Winfrey walked out of an advance screening of the movie only 10 minutes in, because of the gore and dark themes. She considered cancelling an interview with Tom Cruise promoting the film, stating, "I believe there are forces of light and darkness in the world, and I don't want to be a contributor to the force of darkness".

Awards and nominations

Year-end lists
 4th – Sandi Davis, The Oklahoman
 6th – David Stupich, The Milwaukee Journal
 Top 10 (listed alphabetically, not ranked) – Steve Murray, The Atlanta Journal-Constitution
 Top 5 runners-up (not ranked) – Scott Schuldt, The Oklahoman
 Top 10 runner-ups (not ranked) – Janet Maslin, The New York Times
 Honorable mention – Mike Clark, USA Today
 Honorable mention –  Glenn Lovell, San Jose Mercury News
 Honorable mention – Betsy Pickle, Knoxville News-Sentinel
 Honorable mention – Dan Craft, The Pantagraph
 1st worst – John Hurley, Staten Island Advance
 1st worst – Jeff Simon, The Buffalo News
 Dishonorable mention – William Arnold, Seattle Post-Intelligencer

Home media
The film was released on VHS and LaserDisc on June 6, 1995, DVD in 1997 and on Blu-ray Disc on October 7, 2008.

Soundtrack

The film's musical score was written by Elliot Goldenthal and received an Oscar nomination for Best Original Score. The score opens with the Catholic hymn Libera Me slightly rewritten to reflect Louis's character. The opening line "Libera me, Domine, de morte æterna" ("Save me, Lord, from eternal death") was changed to "Libera me, Domine, de vita æterna" ("Save me, Lord, from eternal life").

"Sympathy for the Devil" was performed by Guns N' Roses. This was the band's last major release before the departure of Slash and Duff McKagan.

Sequel

Almost a decade after this film, an adaptation for the third book in the series, The Queen of the Damned, was produced and distributed once again by Warner Bros. Cruise and Pitt did not reprise their roles as Lestat and Louis. Many characters and important plotlines were written out of the film, which actually combined elements of The Vampire Lestat with The Queen of the Damned. The film was negatively received by critics, and Rice dismissed it completely as she felt the filmmakers had "mutilated" her work. During pre-production, Rice had pleaded with the studio not to produce a film of the book just yet as she believed her readers wanted a film based on the second book in the series, The Vampire Lestat. Rice was refused the cooperation of the studio.

In February 2012, a film adaptation of The Tale of the Body Thief, the fourth book in the series, entered development with Brian Grazer and Ron Howard's film production company, Imagine Entertainment. It was reported that screenwriter Lee Patterson was going to pen the screenplay. However, Rice's son, Christopher, apparently had drafted a screenplay based on the novel that was met with praise from those involved in the developmental stage. Rice later confirmed that creative differences that were beyond those involved resulted in the dismissal of the project in April 2013.

In August 2014 Universal Pictures acquired the rights to the entire Vampire Chronicles series. Alex Kurtzman and Roberto Orci were named as producers, and the deal included the aforementioned screenplay for The Tale of the Body Thief written by Christopher Rice.

A new film adaptation of the book was written by Josh Boone and was announced in May 2016, with Boone suggesting actor Jared Leto play the role of Lestat. In November 2016, all plans for a theatrical reboot were scrapped as Rice announced she had regained the rights to her novels and intends to create a television series starting with The Vampire Lestat.

Television series
On June 24, 2021, AMC announced a television adaptation of Interview with the Vampire, giving a series order consisting of seven episodes. The series was created by Rolin Jones, who executive produced alongside Mark Johnson, Alan Taylor, Anne Rice, and Christopher Rice.

See also
 Vampire films

Notes

References

External links

 
 
 
 

1994 films
1994 horror films
1994 romantic drama films
Supernatural drama films
American supernatural horror films
American romantic drama films
BAFTA winners (films)
1990s English-language films
Films based on American horror novels
Films based on works by Anne Rice
Films directed by Neil Jordan
Films scored by Elliot Goldenthal
Films set in 1993
Films set in Louisiana
Films set in New Orleans
Films set in Paris
Films set in San Francisco
Films set in 1791
Films set in 1870
Films set in 1988
Films shot at Pinewood Studios
Films shot in London
Films shot in New Orleans
Films shot in San Francisco
Films shot in Surrey
Golden Raspberry Award winning films
The Geffen Film Company films
American horror drama films
American romantic horror films
Southern Gothic films
American vampire films
Warner Bros. films
Works based on The Vampire Chronicles
Films produced by David Geffen
1990s American films